Rubus subgenus Chamaebatus is a subgenus of flowering plant in the rose family. Species within this subgenus are:

R. calycinus
R. hayata-koidzumii
R. nivalis
R. pectinellus

References 

Chamaebatus
Plant subgenera